ONE is the second extended play by Lee Gi-kwang, released on September 4, 2017.

The album consists of eight new tracks including the lead single "What You Like".

Track listing
Credits are adapted from Naver.

Charts

References

2017 debut EPs
Korean-language EPs
Kakao M EPs